Sergio Rivero Hernández is a Spanish singer born in Las Palmas de Gran Canaria, in the Canary Islands, Spain on 1 April 1986. He took part and won the title in the fourth series of Spanish version of Operación Triunfo in 2004.

Career

He released two albums. The first was Quiero recorded in Madrid and Rome and released on 29 November 2005. Two singles were released from the album, "Cómo cambia la vida" and "Me envenena" the latter becoming a massive hit for him selling 150,000 copies and going platinum. The second album followed exactly a year later. Entitled Contigo, it was released on 28 November 2006, on Sony BMG going gold with 40,000 sales.

In July 2007, he registered in a musical institute in Los Angeles, California, United States to study playing the piano and composing.

Sergio Rivero joined Malú in the musical Jesucristo Superstar (Spanish version of Jesus Christ Superstar)

Discography

Albums
2005: Quiero
2006: Contigo
2012: "Seguiré – EP"
2017: "Quantum”

Singles
2005: "Como cambia la vida"
2006: "Me envenena"
2006: "A escondidas"
2006: "Contigo"
2007: "Bajo el sol"

References

External links
 Sergio Rivero Official website

1986 births
Living people
People from Las Palmas
Singers from the Canary Islands
Spanish pop singers
Star Academy participants
Star Academy winners
Operación Triunfo contestants
21st-century Spanish singers
21st-century Spanish male singers